Hidden Voices (abbreviated GAGA) is a Vietnamese television mystery music game show series that formally recognised as part of I Can See Your Voice franchise. Since its premiere on 5 November 2016, it has aired five seasons on HTV7.

Gameplay

Format
Presented with a group of seven "mystery singers" identified only by their occupation, two opposing guest artists must attempt to eliminate bad singers from the group without ever hearing them sing, assisted by clues and a celebrity panel over the course of three rounds. At the end of the game, the last remaining mystery singers are revealed each as either good or bad by means of a duet between them and one of the guest artists.

Under the battle format, both opponents can eliminate one singer each in the first two rounds, and then both can choose one singer each to join the final performance in the third round. At the end of the game, the conditions for mystery singers chosen by opposing guest artists depending on the outcome of a final performance, if:

Rewards
If one guest artist has a good singer, he/she wins ₫50,000,000. In case of a tie (as both opponents have good singers), the same amount becomes split in half, leaving with ₫25,000,000 each. Both winning singers, regardless of being good or bad, receive ₫10,000,000 each.
Since the fifth season, the eliminated good singer gets a consolation prize of ₫2,000,000.

Rounds
Each episode presents the opposing guest artists with seven people whose identities and singing voices are kept concealed until they are eliminated to perform on the "stage of truth" or remain in the end to perform the final duet.

Notes:

Production

Background and development
Originally based on South Korean programme I Can See Your Voice, the gameplay of Hidden Voices is ruled under modified battle format, which made formally recognised as part of the latter franchise that was then applied to ICSYV counterparts such as Indonesia and Thailand. It is co-produced by Điền Quân Media, Color Entertainment and Pixel Factory; the staff team is managed by producer Trần Thế Khương and director Khương Dừa.

Filming
Tapings for the programme took place at the Pixel Factory Studios in Gò Vấp, Ho Chi Minh City.

According to a statement with director Khương Dừa on 5 April 2020, the series has initially planned to temporarily suspend broadcasts for an upcoming fifth season due to the COVID-19 pandemic, with a possibility of discontinuation. He was then decided to reverse its plans and declare instead that "physical auditions" held from 13 to 15 March 2020 has been cancelled. Replacing that, digital auditions have commenced on 1 April 2020.

Broadcast

History
Hidden Voices debuted on 5 November 2016. In the fourth season having produced 26 episodes, the original television broadcasts aired for 15 episodes from 27 July 2019 until the tentative finale on 2 November 2019. After that, it was then further extended by releasing 11 additional episodes through video on demand until the formal conclusion on 18 January 2020. Despite the fifth season got almost cancelled due to COVID-19 pandemic, it premiered on 28 June 2020.

Special episodes
Since after their recently aired episodes from Indonesian and the Philippine ICSYV counterparts,  defeated  in the kids special (from fourth season on 4 January 2020); while Vũ Cát Tường also defeated Tóc Tiên in the celebrity special (from fifth season on 26 July 2020).

Cast
The series employs a team of "celebrity panelists" who decipher mystery singers' evidences throughout the game. Alongside with full-timers and additional ones, guest panelists also appear since the first season. Throughout its broadcast, the programme has assigned 4 different panelists.

Series overview

Notes

See also
List of television programmes broadcast by HTV

References

External links

 
2010s Vietnamese television series
2020s Vietnamese television series
2016 Vietnamese television series debuts
Ho Chi Minh City Television original programming
Vietnamese television series based on South Korean television series
Vietnamese-language television shows